The following American politicians are affiliated with Trumpism, a conservative movement with far-right, national-populist, and neo-nationalist viewpoints.  Trumpism is a political movement that seeks to aqquire and reatain power for Former President Donald Trump. Trump supporters became a sizable portion of the Republican Party in the United States, however they were not necessarily limited to any one party. In comparison, the rest were frequently labeled as the "establishment." Republicans who disapproved of Trump's rise joined the Never Trump campaign, and some even left the party altogether. The Freedom Caucus is the most major representation of the movement in Congress.

Alabama 

 Katie Britt, Republican U.S Senator from Alabama (2023–present).
 Tommy Tuberville Republican U.S Senator from Alabama (2021–present).
 Jerry Carl, Republican U.S Representative from Alabama's 1st district (2021–present).
 Barry Moore, Republican U.S Representative from Alabama's 2nd district (2021–present).
 Mike Rodgers, Republican U.S Representative from Alabama's 3rd district (2003–present).
 Robert Aderholt, Republican U.S Representative from Alabama's 4th district (2003–present).
 Mo Brooks, Republican U.S Representative from Alabama's 5th district (2011–2023), Member of the Madison County Commission from the 5th district (1996–2011), and Member of the Alabama House of Representatives (1982–1992).
 Dale Strong, Republican U.S Representative from Alabama's 5th district (2023–present).
 Gary Palmer, Chair of the House Republican Policy Committee (2019–present) and Republican U.S Representative from Alabama's 6th district (2015–present).

Alaska 

 Kelly Tshibaka, Candidate for U.S Senator from Alaska in 2022.  
 Sarah Palin, Candidate for U.S Representative from Alaska's at-large congressional seat in 2022 Special and 2022 General, 9th Governor of Alaska (2006–2009), Chair of the Alaska Oil and Gas Conservation Commission (2003–2004), Mayor of Wasilla (1996–2002), and Member of the Wasilla City Council from Ward E (1992–1996).

Arizona 

 Blake Masters, Republican nominee for U.S Senator from Arizona in 2022.
 David Schweikert, Republican U.S Representative from Arizona's 6th district (2011–present), Treasurer of Maricopa County (2004–2007), and Member of the Arizona House of Representatives from the 28th district (1991–1995).
 Eli Crane, Republican U.S Representative from Arizona's 2nd district (2023–present).

Arkansas 

 John Boozman, Republican U.S Senator from Arkansas (2011–present) and U.S Representative from Arkansas's 3rd district (2001–2011).

Connecticut 

 Leora Levy, Republican nominee for U.S Senator from Connecticut in 2022.

Georgia 

 Herschel Walker, Republican nominee for U.S Senator from Georgia in 2022.

Iowa 

 Chuck Grassley, Republican U.S Senator from Iowa (1981–present) and U.S Representative from Iowa's 3rd District (1975–1981).

Kentucky 

 Rand Paul, Republican U.S Senator from Kentucky (2011–present).

Louisiana 

 John Kennedy, Republican U.S Senator from Louisiana (2017–present), Treasurer of Louisiana (2000–2017), and Secretary of the Louisiana Department of Revenue (1996 -1999).

Missouri 

 Eric Schmitt, Republican U.S Senator from Missouri (2023–present), 43rd Attorney General of Missouri (2019–2023), 46th Treasurer of Missouri (2017–2019), and Member of the Missouri Senate from the 15th district (2001–2009).

Nevada 

 Adam Laxalt, Republican nominee for U.S Senator from Nevada in 2022, Republican nominee for Governor of Nevada in 2018, and 33rd Attorney General of Nevada (2015–2019).

New Hampshire 

 Don Bolduc, Republican nominee for U.S Senator from New Hampshire in 2022 and Candidate for U.S Senator in 2020.

North Carolina 

 Ted Budd, Republican U.S Senator from North Carolina (2023–present) and U.S Representative from North Carolina's 13th District (2017–2023).

Ohio 

 J. D. Vance, Republican U.S Senator from Ohio (2023–present).

Oklahoma 

 James Lankford, Republican U.S Senator from Oklahoma (2015–present) and U.S Representative from Oklahoma's 5th district.
 Markwayne Mullin, Republican U.S Senator from Oklahoma (2023–present) and U.S Representative from Oklahoma's 2nd district.

Utah 

 Mike Lee, Republican U.S Senator from Utah.

Wisconsin 

 Ron Johnson, Republican U.S Senator from Wisconsin.

References 

Trumpism
Trumpism